Worrell Ricardo Sterling (born 8 June 1965) is an English former professional footballer who played as a winger.

Sterling began his career as a trainee with Watford, before signing as a professional with them in 1983. He went on to play for Peterborough United, Bristol Rovers and Lincoln City before ending his league career in 1997, completing, in total, more than 400 league appearances.

References

External links

Lincoln City F.C. Official Archive Profile
Rushden & Diamonds F.C. Official Profile
Huntingdonshire Regional College Official Site

1965 births
Living people
Footballers from Bethnal Green
English footballers
Association football wingers
Watford F.C. players
Peterborough United F.C. players
Bristol Rovers F.C. players
Lincoln City F.C. players
Rushden & Diamonds F.C. players
English Football League players